Phuntsog Namgyal may refer to any of the following:
 Phuntsog Namgyal (1604-1670), king in Sikkim
 Phuntsog Namgyal II (1733–1780), king in Sikkim
 Phuntsog Namgyal, king of the Namgyal dynasty of Ladakh

See also
Phuntsok Namgyal, an Indian politician from Ladakh